Budha Subba Gold Cup is an annual international club-level knockout association football tournament in Nepal. The competition is held yearly in Dharan, Province No. 1 by Dharan Football Club every year in Nepal. The competition is the premier cup that has kept the aspiring Nepalese football alive and showcases the young and experienced talents from all of Nepal best clubs.

Previous winners

Top performing clubs

References

External links
RSSSF.com - Nepal - List of Champions and Cup Winners

 
Football cup competitions in Nepal